Tsugutoshi is a masculine Japanese given name.

Possible writings
Tsugutoshi can be written using different combinations of kanji characters. Here are some examples:

次敏, "next, agile"
次俊, "next, talented"
次利, "next, benefit"
次寿, "next, long life"
次年, "next, year"
嗣敏, "succession, agile"
嗣俊, "succession, talented"
嗣利, "succession, benefit"
嗣寿, "succession, long life"
嗣年, "succession, year"
継敏, "continue, agile"
継俊, "continue, talented"
継利, "continue, benefit"
継寿, "continue, long life"
継年, "continue, year"

The name can also be written in hiragana つぐとし or katakana ツグトシ.

Notable people with the name
, Japanese musician
, Japanese footballer

Japanese masculine given names